Psiloscirtus bolivianus is a species of short-horned grasshopper in the family Acrididae. It is found in Bolovia.

References

External links

 

Acrididae
Orthoptera of South America
Insects of Bolivia
Endemic fauna of Bolivia
Insects described in 1920